The Eelam People's Revolutionary Liberation Front (EPRLF) is a series of Sri Lankan political parties and a former militant separatist group.

Militant separatists
The EPRLF was formed in 1980 by K. Pathmanabha (Padmanaba), Douglas Devananda, Suresh Premachandran and Varatharajah Perumal as a breakaway faction of the Eelam Revolutionary Organisation of Students.

In 1982 the EPRLF formed a military wing, People's Liberation Army, headed by Douglas Devananda. The PLA is believed to have received military training by the Popular Front for the Liberation of Palestine.

In early 1986 disputes amongst the EPRLF leadership led to it splitting into two factions: EPRLF (Ranjan) and EPRLF (Douglas).

In late 1986 the Tamil Tigers attacked the EPRLF, inflicting heavy losses. Many of its cadres were killed or taken prisoner and its camps and weapons were seized by the Tigers. Douglas Devananda was blamed for the debacle.

In 1987 the EPRLF (Douglas) faction formally split from the EPRLF. It initially formed the Eelam National Democratic Liberation Front with a breakaway faction of the People's Liberation Organisation of Tamil Eelam led by Paranthan Rajan, but later transformed itself into the Eelam People's Democratic Party.

Political party
After its military defeat by the Tamil Tigers the EPRLF transformed itself into political party and allied itself with the Indian Peace Keeping Force (IPKF) who were occupying much of Northern and Eastern Sri Lanka.

The EPRLF's first foray into politics came in the flawed 1988 provincial council elections. With the assistance of IPKF the EPRLF secured 41 of the 71 seats on the North Eastern Provincial Council. On 10 December 1988 Varatharajah Perumal became the first Chief Minister of the North Eastern Provincial Council.

The EPRLF formed an alliance with the Eelam National Democratic Liberation Front, Tamil Eelam Liberation Organization and Tamil United Liberation Front to contest the 1989 parliamentary elections. The alliance won 188,593 votes (3.40%), securing 10 of the 225 seats in Parliament. 7 of the 10 alliance MPs were from the EPRLF.

On 1 March 1990, just as the IPKF were preparing to withdraw from Sri Lanka, Varatharajah Permual moved a motion in the North Eastern Provincial Council declaring an independent Eelam. President Premadasa reacted to Permual's UDI by dissolving the provincial council and imposing direct rule on the province. The EPRLF's leadership fled to Madras (now Chennai), India.

On 19 June 1990 the Tamil Tigers attacked an EPRLF meeting in Madras, murdering thirteen EPRLF members including leader K. Padmanaba, Jaffna District MP G. Yogasangari and former North Eastern Province Finance Minister P. Kirubakaran.

In 1997, after the Sri Lankan military had recaptured the Jaffna peninsula from the Tamil Tigers, the EPRLF re-opened its Jaffna office. It took part in the 1998 local elections held in the peninsula and was able to win 13,140 votes (14.35%), winning 25 seats across 11 local councils.

The party broke into two factions in 1999 when its General Secretary Kandaiah "Suresh" Premachandran made a deal with the Tamil Tigers. The majority of the party formed the EPRLF (Varathar) wing under the leadership of Varatharajah Perumal whilst the rest formed the EPRLF (Suresh) wing under the leadership of Suresh Premachandran. Crucially Suresh had control of most of the EPRLF's assets as well as its name (as registered with the Sri Lankan Department of Elections).

Suresh wing
The Suresh wing joined other pro-Tamil Tiger parties in 2001 to form the Tamil National Alliance (TNA).

2001 Parliamentary General Election

2004 Parliamentary General Election

2010 Parliamentary General Election

Varathar wing / Padmanaba wing
The Varathar wing has restyled itself as the Padmanaba wing, after its murdered leader. It is registered as a political party with the Sri Lankan Department of Elections under the name of Padmanaba Eelam People's Revolutionary Liberation Front. In 2008 it joined with other anti-Tamil Tiger parties to form the Tamil Democratic National Alliance (later restyled Democratic Tamil National Alliance) to contest provincial and local elections.

The wing's de facto leader (Varatharajah Perumal is in exile in India) Kandiah "Robert" Subathiran was murdered on 14 June 2003. The wing's current General Secretary (and de facto leader) is Thirunavukkarasu Sritharan (Sridharan).

Paramilitary group
There have been repeated allegations that various factions of the EPRLF, despite their claim to have given up violence, operate armed wings which have worked with the IPKF and Sri Lankan Army. A group composed of former EPRLF cadres known as Razeek Group works along with the Sri Lankan Army as a paramilitary group in activities against the Tamil Tigers in the Batticaloa region. They have also been accused of indulging in massacres, kidnappings and torture

References

External links
 EPRLF (Padmanaba wing)

 
Sri Lankan Tamil nationalist parties
Political parties in Sri Lanka
Tamil Eelam
Foreign intervention in the Sri Lankan Civil War
Indian Peace Keeping Force
Paramilitary organisations based in Sri Lanka
1980 establishments in Sri Lanka
Political parties established in 1980